The California and Nevada Credit Union Leagues are the trade association for credit unions in those states. They serve more than 233 credit unions in California and Nevada with more than 12 million members and more than $253 billion in assets.  (Effective Jan. 2022)

The two Leagues joined in 1996 and became known as the California and Nevada Credit Union Leagues. The Leagues are the largest state-level credit union trade association in the United States. The Leagues are geographically divided into 20 chapters (18 in California, 2 in Nevada). Each League has its own chairman and board of directors elected by member credit unions in the respective states. 

Within the three-tier credit union system, the Leagues maintain a mutual partnership with the Credit Union National Association (CUNA).

Brief history of the California Credit Union League
In 1933, less than 10 years after the founding of the first credit union in California, the California Credit Union League was organized by a group of approximately 25 credit unions at a meeting in Fresno. By 1940, League membership had grown to 246 credit unions. The San Francisco Credit Union Digest (eventually renamed as Credit Union Digest) was adopted as the official flagship publication of the League in 1941.

The League shared its first headquarters with East Bay Postal Credit Union on the second floor of the Oakland Post Office. Founded in 1927, East Bay Postal Credit Union merged with and into Pacific Postal Credit Union July 1, 2012,  continuing consolidation within the industry. Throughout the years, the League's headquarters moved from the Bay Area to Pomona to Rancho Cucamonga to its current location in Ontario, California. The Leagues also currently operate offices in Sacramento, California and Washington, D.C.

The League has launched a number of credit union service organizations, including Western Bridge Corporate Federal Credit Union in 1977 (which was formerly known as the California Central Federal Credit Union and then as Western Corporate Federal Credit Union, and consolidated into Catalyst Corporate FCU in July 2012); CO-OP Financial Services (formerly known as CU-ATM Cooperatives, Inc.) in 1981; CU Direct Corporation in 1994 in partnership with The Golden 1 Credit Union; and CU West Mortgage, Inc. in 2003, in partnership with SchoolsFirst Federal Credit Union (formerly Orange County Teachers FCU).

In 1992, the League founded the Shapiro Group to cooperatively pool the resources of the credit union community to help small credit unions operate efficiently and effectively. The first group of its kind, it was named in honor of San Francisco attorney Leo H. Shapiro, remembered as the “father of the credit union movement in California.”

California Credit Union League CEOs:

 1933–1939 - John L. Moore
 1939–1941 - Ralph Hagin
 1941–1942 - Charles A. Drenk
 1942–1964 - Clarence Murphy
 1964–1974 - Wil Wyatt
 1974–1989 - W. “Bill” F. Broxterman
 1989 - Richard “Dick” M. Johnson (Interim President)
 1989–1990 - Christopher L. Stewart
 1990 - Richard “Dick” M. Johnson (Interim President)
 1991–2006 - David L. Chatfield
 2006–2010 - Bill Cheney]
 2010 - David L. Chatfield (Interim President)
 2010–present - Diana R. Dykstra

Brief history of the Nevada Credit Union League
The Nevada Credit Union League was formed in 1969. Darrel R. Daines was elected as the League's first president and the first board of directors was formed. Later that year, Glen A. Reese assumed the role as the League's managing director and the Maryland Parkway League offices opened.

The League's first annual meeting was held in 1970; the same year the first issue of its flagship publication, Nevada Nuggets, was published. In 1975, the League celebrated the passage of the state's credit union law. The first state-chartered credit union was Nevada Central CU.

Between the years of 1976 through 1990, the League became fully self-supporting, CU Plaza became its new headquarters, a credit union division was formed within the state's Department of Commerce, membership in Nevada credit unions increased, and the Nevada CU Political Action Committee was formed.

The leagues join forces
In September 1995, the California Credit Union League board of directors approved a management services agreement with the Nevada Credit Union League which allowed the two leagues to remain separate entities, with the California League providing a range of services to Nevada credit unions. In October 1995, the 15 credit union members of the Nevada League voted unanimously to support the agreement, which went into effect January 1, 1996. At the time, then-California League President and CEO David L. Chatfield became president and CEO of both leagues, while Nevada League President and CEO Glen Reese stayed on as a consultant.

Services
The Leagues provide an array of services to its member credit unions within a framework of innovation and cooperation in the following areas:

Advocacy
This division includes Federal Government Affairs, State Government Affairs, Regulatory Advocacy, and a Political Action Committee (PAC).

Member Solutions
This division includes Membership, Communications and Marketing; Education & Professional Development; Compliance; and Credit Union Solutions.

References

External links

Credit union leagues
Credit unions based in California
Trade associations based in the United States